The Second Polish Republic, at the time officially known as the Republic of Poland, was a country in Central and Eastern Europe that existed between 11 November 1918 and 17 September 1939. The state was established at the end of the First World War. The Second Republic ceased to exist in 1939, when Poland was invaded by Nazi Germany, the Soviet Union and the Slovak Republic, marking the beginning of the European theatre of the Second World War. The Polish government-in-exile was established in Paris to replace the Second Republic in the war.

In 1938, the Second Republic was the sixth largest country in Europe. According to the 1921 census, the number of inhabitants was 27.2 million. By 1939, just before the outbreak of World War II, this had grown to an estimated 35.1 million. Almost a third of the population came from minority groups: 13.9% Ruthenians; 10% Ashkenazi Jews; 3.1% Belarusians; 2.3% Germans and 3.4% Czechs and Lithuanians. At the same time, a significant number of ethnic Poles lived outside the country's borders.

When, after several regional conflicts, the borders of the state were finalised in 1922, Poland's neighbours were Czechoslovakia, Germany, the Free City of Danzig, Lithuania, Latvia, Romania and the Soviet Union. It had access to the Baltic Sea via a short strip of coastline known as the Polish Corridor on either side of the city of Gdynia. Between March and August 1939, Poland also shared a border with the then-Hungarian governorate of Subcarpathia.

The Second Republic maintained moderate economic development. The cultural hubs of interwar PolandWarsaw, Kraków, Poznań, Wilno and Lwówbecame major European cities and the sites of internationally acclaimed universities and other institutions of higher education. The Republic openly discriminated against its Jewish (and to a lesser extent its Ukrainian) citizens, restricting Jewish entry into professions and placing limitations on Jewish businesses.

Name
The official name of the state was the Republic of Poland. In the Polish language, it was referred to as Rzeczpospolita Polska (abbr. RP), with the term Rzeczpospolita being a traditional name for the republic when referring to various Polish states, including the Polish–Lithuanian Commonwealth, and later, the current Third Polish Republic. In other regionally-used official languages, the state was referred to as: Republik Polen in German, Польська Республіка (transcription: Polʹsʹka Respublika) in Ukrainian, Польская Рэспубліка (transcription: Poĺskaja Respublika) in Belarusian, and Lenkijos Respublika, in Lithuanian.

Between 14 November 1918 and 13 March 1919, the state was referred to in Polish as Republika Polska, instead of Rzeczpospolita Polska. Both terms mean the Republic; however, republika is a general term, while Rzeczpospolita traditionally refers exclusively to Polish states. Additionally, between 8 November 1918 and 16 August 1919, the Journal of Laws of the Polish State referred to the country as the Polish State (Polish: Państwo Polskie).

After the Second World War and the establishment of the later states of the Polish People's Republic and the Third Polish Republic, the state was referred to as the Second Polish Republic. In the Polish language, the country is traditionally referred to as II Rzeczpospolita (Druga Rzeczpospolita), which means the Second Republic.

Background

After more than a century of partitions between the Austrian, the Prussian, and the Russian imperial powers, Poland re-emerged as a sovereign state at the end of the First World War in Europe in 1917–1918. The victorious Allies of the First World War confirmed the rebirth of Poland in the Treaty of Versailles of June 1919. It was one of the great stories of the 1919 Paris Peace Conference. Poland solidified its independence in a series of border wars fought by the newly formed Polish Army from 1918 to 1921. The extent of the eastern half of the interwar territory of Poland was settled diplomatically in 1922 and internationally recognised by the League of Nations.

End of the First World War
Over the course of the First World War (1914-1918), the German Empire gradually dominated the Eastern Front as the Imperial Russian Army fell back. German and Austro-Hungarian armies seized the Russian-ruled part of what became Poland. In a failed attempt to resolve the Polish question as quickly as possible, Berlin set up the puppet Kingdom of Poland on 14 January 1917, with a governing Provisional Council of State and (from 15 October 1917) a Regency Council (Rada Regencyjna Królestwa Polskiego). The Council administered the country under German auspices (see also Mitteleuropa), pending the election of a king. More than a month before Germany surrendered on 11 November 1918 and the war ended, the Regency Council had dissolved the Provisional Council of State and announced its intention to restore Polish independence (7 October 1918). With the notable exception of the Marxist-oriented Social Democratic Party of the Kingdom of Poland and Lithuania (SDKPiL), most Polish political parties supported this move. On 23 October the Regency Council appointed a new government under Józef Świeżyński and began conscription into the Polish Army.

Formation of the Republic

In 1918–1919, over 100 workers' councils sprang up on Polish territories; on 5 November 1918, in Lublin, the first Soviet of Delegates was established. On 6 November socialists proclaimed the Republic of Tarnobrzeg at Tarnobrzeg in Austrian Galicia. The same day the Socialist, Ignacy Daszyński, set up a Provisional People's Government of the Republic of Poland (Tymczasowy Rząd Ludowy Republiki Polskiej) in Lublin. On Sunday, 10 November at 7 a.m., Józef Piłsudski, newly freed from 16 months in a German prison in Magdeburg, returned by train to Warsaw. Piłsudski, together with Colonel Kazimierz Sosnkowski, was greeted at Warsaw's railway station by Regent Zdzisław Lubomirski and by Colonel Adam Koc. Next day, due to his popularity and support from most political parties, the Regency Council appointed Piłsudski as Commander in Chief of the Polish Armed Forces. On 14 November, the Council dissolved itself and transferred all its authority to Piłsudski as Chief of State (Naczelnik Państwa). After consultation with Piłsudski, Daszyński's government dissolved itself and a new government formed under Jędrzej Moraczewski. In 1918, the Kingdom of Italy became the first country in Europe to recognise Poland's renewed sovereignty.

Centres of government that formed at that time in Galicia (formerly Austrian-ruled southern Poland) included the National Council of the Principality of Cieszyn (established in November 1918), the Republic of Zakopane and the Polish Liquidation Committee (28 October). Soon afterward, the Polish–Ukrainian War broke out in Lwów (1 November 1918) between forces of the Military Committee of Ukrainians and the Polish irregular units made up of students known as the Lwów Eaglets, who were later supported by the Polish Army (see Battle of Lwów (1918), Battle of Przemyśl (1918)). Meanwhile, in western Poland, another war of national liberation began under the banner of the Greater Poland uprising (1918–1919). In January 1919, Czechoslovak forces attacked Polish units in the area of Zaolzie (see Polish–Czechoslovak War). Soon afterwards, the Polish–Lithuanian War (ca 1919–1920) began, and, in August 1919, Polish-speaking residents of Upper Silesia initiated a series of three Silesian Uprisings. The most critical military conflict of that period, however, the Polish–Soviet War (1919-1921), ended in a decisive Polish victory. In 1919, the Warsaw government suppressed the Republic of Tarnobrzeg and the workers' councils.

Politics and government

The Second Polish Republic was a parliamentary democracy from 1919 (see Small Constitution of 1919) to 1926, with the President having limited powers. The Parliament elected him, and he could appoint the Prime Minister as well as the government with the Sejm'''s (lower house's) approval, but he could only dissolve the Sejm with the Senate's consent. Moreover, his power to pass decrees was limited by the requirement that the Prime Minister and the appropriate other Minister had to verify his decrees with their signatures. Poland was one of the first countries in the world to recognise women's suffrage. Women in Poland were granted the right to vote on 28 November 1918 by a decree of General Józef Piłsudski.

The major political parties at this time were the Polish Socialist Party, National Democrats, various Peasant Parties, Christian Democrats, and political groups of ethnic minorities (German: German Social Democratic Party of Poland, Jewish: General Jewish Labour Bund in Poland, United Jewish Socialist Workers Party, and Ukrainian: Ukrainian National Democratic Alliance). Frequently changing governments (see 1919 Polish legislative election, 1922 Polish legislative election) and other negative publicity the politicians received (such as accusations of corruption or the 1919 Polish coup attempt), made them increasingly unpopular. Major politicians at this time, in addition to General Piłsudski, included peasant activist Wincenty Witos (Prime Minister three times) and right-wing leader Roman Dmowski. Ethnic minorities were represented in the Sejm; e.g. in 1928 – 1930 there was the Ukrainian-Belarusian Club, with 26 Ukrainian and 4 Belarusian members.

After the Polish – Soviet war, Marshal Piłsudski led an intentionally modest life, writing historical books for a living. After he took power through a military coup in May 1926, he emphasised that he wanted to heal Polish society and politics of excessive partisan politics. His regime, accordingly, was called Sanacja in Polish. The 1928 parliamentary elections were still considered free and fair, although the pro-Piłsudski Nonpartisan Bloc for Cooperation with the Government won them. The following three parliamentary elections (in 1930, 1935 and 1938) were manipulated, with opposition activists sent to Bereza Kartuska prison (see also Brest trials). As a result, the pro-government party Camp of National Unity won huge majorities in them. Piłsudski died just after an authoritarian constitution was approved in the spring of 1935. During the last four years of the Second Polish Republic, the major politicians included President Ignacy Mościcki, Foreign Minister Józef Beck and the Commander-in-Chief of the Polish Army, Marshal Edward Rydz-Śmigły. The country was divided into 104 electoral districts, and those politicians who were forced to leave Poland founded Front Morges in 1936. The government that ruled the Second Polish Republic in its final years is frequently referred to as Piłsudski's colonels.

Military

Interwar Poland had a large army of 950,000 soldiers on active duty: in 37 infantry divisions, 11 cavalry brigades, and two armored brigades, plus artillery units. Another 700,000 men served in the reserves. At the outbreak of the war, the Polish Army was able to put in the field almost one million soldiers, 4,300 guns, around 1,000 armored vehicles including in between 200 and 300 tanks (the majority of the armored vehicles were outclassed tankettes) and 745 aircraft (however, only around 450 of them were bombers and fighters available to fight as of September 1, 1939).

The training of the Polish Army was thorough. The non-commissioned officers were a competent body of men with expert knowledge and high ideals. The officers, both senior and junior, constantly refreshed their training in the field and in the lecture hall, where modern technical achievement and the lessons of contemporary wars were demonstrated and discussed. The equipment of the Polish Army was less developed technically than that of Nazi Germany and its rearmament was slowed down by confidence in Western European military support and by budget difficulties.

The Polish command system at the level of the entire Polish military and the armies was obsolete. The generals in command of the armies had to ask permission from the high command. The Polish military attempted to organize fronts made of armies' groups only when it was already too late during the Polish Defensive War in 1939.

Economy

After regaining its independence, Poland was faced with major economic difficulties. In addition to the devastation brought by the First World War, the exploitation of the Polish economy by the German and Russian occupying powers, and the sabotage performed by retreating armies, the new republic was faced with the task of economically unifying disparate economic regions, which had previously been part of different countries and different empires. Within the borders of the Republic were the remnants of three different economic systems, with five different currencies (the German mark, the Imperial Russian rouble, the Austrian krone, the Polish marka and the Ostrubel) and with little or no direct infrastructural links. The situation was so bad that neighbouring industrial centres, as well as major cities, lacked direct railway links because they had been parts of different jurisdictions and different empires. For example, there was no direct railway connection between Warsaw and Kraków until 1934. This situation was described by Melchior Wańkowicz in his book Sztafeta.

In addition to this was the massive destruction left after both the First World War and the Polish–Soviet War. There was also a great economic disparity between the eastern (commonly called Poland B) and western (called Poland A) parts of the country, with the western half, especially areas that had belonged to Prussia and the German Empire, being much more developed and prosperous. Frequent border closures and a customs war with Germany also had negative economic impacts on Poland. In 1924, Prime Minister Władysław Grabski, who was also the Economic Minister, introduced the złoty as a single common currency for Poland (replacing the marka), which remained a stable currency. The currency helped Poland to control the massive hyperinflation. It was the only country in Europe able to do this without foreign loans or aid. The average annual growth rate (GDP per capita) was 5.24% in 1920–29 and 0.34% in 1929–38.

Hostile relations with neighbours were a major problem for the economy of interbellum Poland. In the year 1937, foreign trade with all neighbours amounted to only 21% of Poland's total. Trade with Germany, Poland's most important neighbour, accounted for 14.3% of Polish exchange. Foreign trade with the Soviet Union (0.8%) was virtually nonexistent. Czechoslovakia accounted for 3.9%, Latvia for 0.3%, and Romania for 0.8%. By mid-1938, after the Anschluss with Austria, Greater Germany was responsible for as much as 23% of Polish foreign trade.

The basis of Poland's gradual recovery after the Great Depression was its mass economic development plans (see Four Year Plan), which oversaw the building of three key infrastructural elements. The first was the establishment of the Gdynia seaport, which allowed Poland to completely bypass Gdańsk (which was under heavy German pressure to boycott Polish coal exports). The second was construction of the 500-kilometre rail connection between Upper Silesia and Gdynia, called the Polish Coal Trunk-Line, which served freight trains with coal. The third was the creation of a central industrial district named COP – Centralny Okręg Przemysłowy (English: Central Industrial Region). Unfortunately, these developments were interrupted and largely destroyed by the German and Soviet invasion and the start of the Second World War. Other achievements of interbellum Poland included Stalowa Wola (a brand new city, built in a forest around a steel mill), Mościce (now a district of Tarnów, with a large nitrate factory), and the creation of a central bank called the Bank of Poland. There were several trade fairs, with the most popular being Poznań International Fair, Lwów's Targi Wschodnie, and Wilno's Targi Północne. Polish Radio had ten stations (see Radio stations in interwar Poland), with the eleventh one planned to be opened in the autumn of 1939. Furthermore, in 1935, Polish engineers began working on TV services. By early 1939, experts of the Polish Radio built four TV sets. The first movie broadcast by experimental Polish TV was Barbara Radziwiłłówna, and by 1940, a regular TV service was scheduled to begin operation.

Interbellum Poland was also a country with numerous social problems. Unemployment was high, and poverty in the countryside was widespread, which resulted in several cases of social unrest, such as the 1923 Kraków riot, and 1937 peasant strike in Poland. There were conflicts with national minorities, such as the Pacification of Ukrainians in Eastern Galicia (1930), relations with Polish neighbours were sometimes complicated (see Soviet raid on Stołpce, Polish–Czechoslovak border conflicts, and the 1938 Polish ultimatum to Lithuania). On top of this, there were natural disasters, such as the 1934 flood in Poland.

Major industrial centres

Interbellum Poland was unofficially divided into two parts – better developed "Poland A" in the west, and underdeveloped "Poland B" in the east. Polish industry was concentrated in the west, mostly in Polish Upper Silesia, and the adjacent Lesser Poland's province of Zagłębie Dąbrowskie, where the bulk of coal mines and steel plants was located. Furthermore, heavy industry plants were located in Częstochowa (Huta Częstochowa, founded in 1896), Ostrowiec Świętokrzyski (Huta Ostrowiec, founded in 1837–1839), Stalowa Wola (brand new industrial city, which was built from scratch in 1937 – 1938), Chrzanów (Fablok, founded in 1919), Jaworzno, Trzebinia (oil refinery, opened in 1895), Łódź (the seat of Polish textile industry), Poznań (H. Cegielski – Poznań), Kraków and Warsaw (Ursus Factory). Further east, in Kresy, industrial centres included two major cities of the region – Lwów and Wilno (Elektrit).

Besides coal mining, Poland also had deposits of oil in Borysław, Drohobycz, Jasło and Gorlice (see Polmin), potassium salt (TESP), and basalt (Janowa Dolina). Apart from already-existing industrial areas, in the mid-1930s an ambitious, state-sponsored project called the Central Industrial Region was started under Minister Eugeniusz Kwiatkowski. One of the characteristic features of the Polish economy in the interbellum was the gradual nationalisation of major plants. This was the case for the Ursus Factory (see Państwowe Zakłady Inżynieryjne) and several steelworks, such as Huta Pokój in Ruda Śląska – Nowy Bytom, Huta Królewska in Chorzów – Królewska Huta, Huta Laura in Siemianowice Śląskie, as well as Scheibler and Grohman Works in Łódź.

Transport

Railways were very dense in the western part of the country, while in the east, especially Polesie, rail was non-existent in some counties. During the interbellum period, the Polish Government constructed several new lines, mainly in the central part of the country (see also Polish State Railroads Summer 1939). Construction of the extensive Warszawa Główna railway station was never finished due to the war, while Polish railways were famous for their punctuality (see Luxtorpeda, Strzała Bałtyku, Latający Wilnianin).

In the interbellum, the road network of Poland was dense, but the quality of the roads was very poor – only 7% of all roads were paved and ready for automobile use, and none of the major cities were connected with each other by a good-quality highway. In 1939 the Poles built only one highway: 28 km of straight concrete road connecting the villages of Warlubie and Osiek (mid-northern Poland). It was designed by Italian engineer Piero Puricelli.

In the mid-1930s, Poland had  of roads, but only 58,000 had a hard surface (gravel, cobblestone or sett), and 2,500 were modern, with an asphalt or concrete surface. In different parts of the country, there were sections of paved roads, which suddenly ended, and were followed by dirt roads. The poor condition of the roads was the result of both long-lasting foreign dominance and inadequate funding. On 29 January 1931, the Polish Parliament created the State Road Fund, the purpose of which was to collect money for the construction and conservation of roads. The government drafted a 10-year plan, with road priorities: a highway from Wilno, through Warsaw and Kraków, to Zakopane (called Marshal Piłsudski Highway), asphalt highways from Warsaw to Poznań and Łódź, as well as a Warsaw ring road. However, the plan turned out to be too ambitious, with insufficient money in the national budget to pay for it. In January 1938, the Polish Road Congress estimated that Poland would need to spend three times as much money on roads to keep up with Western Europe.

In 1939, before the outbreak of the war, LOT Polish Airlines, which was established in 1929, had its hub at Warsaw Okęcie Airport. At that time, LOT maintained several services, both domestic and international. Warsaw had regular domestic connections with Gdynia-Rumia, Danzig-Langfuhr, Katowice-Muchowiec, Kraków-Rakowice-Czyżyny, Lwów-Skniłów, Poznań-Ławica, and Wilno-Porubanek. Furthermore, in cooperation with Air France, LARES, Lufthansa, and Malert, international connections were maintained with Athens, Beirut, Berlin, Bucharest, Budapest, Helsinki, Kaunas, London, Paris, Prague, Riga, Rome, Tallinn, and Zagreb.

Agriculture

Statistically, the majority of citizens lived in the countryside (75% in 1921). Farmers made up 65% of the population. In 1929, agricultural production made up 65% of Poland's GNP. After 123 years of partitions, regions of the country were very unevenly developed. The lands of the former German Empire were the most advanced; in Greater Poland, Upper Silesia and Pomerelia, farming and crops were on a Western European level. The situation was much worse in parts of Congress Poland, the Eastern Borderlands, and what was formerly Galicia, where agriculture was quite backward and primitive, with a large number of small farms, unable to succeed in either the domestic or international market. Another problem was the overpopulation of the countryside, which resulted in chronic unemployment. Living conditions were so bad in several eastern regions, such as the counties inhabited by the Hutsul minority, that there was permanent starvation. Farmers rebelled against the government (see: 1937 peasant strike in Poland), and the situation began to change in the late 1930s, due to the construction of several factories for the Central Industrial Region, which gave employment to thousands of rural and small town residents.

German trade
Beginning in June 1925, there was a customs' war, with the revanchist Weimar Republic imposing a trade embargo against Poland for nearly a decade; it involved tariffs and broad economic restrictions. After 1933 the trade war ended. The new agreements regulated and promoted trade. Germany became Poland's largest trading partner, followed by Britain. In October 1938, Germany granted a credit of 60,000,000| Reichsmarks to Poland (120,000,000 zloty, or £4,800,000 stg) which was never realised, due to the outbreak of war. Germany would deliver factory equipment and machinery in return for Polish timber and agricultural produce. This new trade was to be in addition to the existing German-Polish trade agreements.Keesing's Contemporary Archives Volume 3, (October 1938) p. 3283.

Education and culture

In 1919, the Polish government introduced compulsory education for all children aged 7 to 14, in an effort to limit illiteracy, which was widespread, especially in the former Russian Partition and the Austrian Partition of eastern Poland. In 1921, one-third of citizens of Poland remained illiterate (38% in the countryside). The process was slow, but by 1931 the illiteracy level had dropped to 23% overall (27% in the countryside) and further down to 18% in 1937. By 1939, over 90% of children attended school.Norman Davies (2005), God's Playground A History of Poland: Volume II: 1795 to the Present. Oxford University Press, p. 175. . In 1932, Janusz Jędrzejewicz, the Minister for Religion and Education, carried out a major reform which introduced two main levels of education: common school (szkoła powszechna), with three levels – 4 grades + 2 grades + 1 grade; and middle school (szkoła średnia), with two levels – 4 grades of comprehensive middle school and 2 grades of specified high school (classical, humanistic, natural and mathematical). A graduate of middle school received a small matura, while a graduate of high school received a big matura, which enabled them to seek university-level education.

Before 1918, Poland had three universities: Jagiellonian University, the University of Warsaw and Lwów University. The Catholic University of Lublin was established in 1918; Adam Mickiewicz University, Poznań, in 1919; and finally, in 1922, after the annexation of the Republic of Central Lithuania, Wilno University became the Republic's sixth university. There were also three technical colleges: the Warsaw University of Technology, Lwów Polytechnic and the AGH University of Science and Technology in Kraków, established in 1919. Warsaw University of Life Sciences was an agricultural institute. By 1939, there were around 50,000 students enrolled in further education. 28% of students at universities were women, which was the second highest share in Europe.

Polish science in the interbellum was renowned for its mathematicians gathered around the Lwów School of Mathematics, the Kraków School of Mathematics, as well as the Warsaw School of Mathematics. There were world-class philosophers in the Lwów–Warsaw school of logic and philosophy. Florian Znaniecki founded Polish sociological studies. Rudolf Weigl invented a vaccine against typhus. Bronisław Malinowski counted among the most important anthropologists of the 20th century. 

In Polish literature, the 1920s were marked by the domination of poetry. Polish poets were divided into two groups – the Skamanderites (Jan Lechoń, Julian Tuwim, Antoni Słonimski and Jarosław Iwaszkiewicz) and the Futurists (Anatol Stern, Bruno Jasieński, Aleksander Wat, Julian Przyboś). Apart from well-established novelists (Stefan Żeromski, Władysław Reymont), new names appeared in the interbellum – Zofia Nałkowska, Maria Dąbrowska, Jarosław Iwaszkiewicz, Jan Parandowski, Bruno Schultz, Stanisław Ignacy Witkiewicz, Witold Gombrowicz. Among other notable artists there were sculptor Xawery Dunikowski, painters Julian Fałat, Wojciech Kossak and Jacek Malczewski, composers Karol Szymanowski, Feliks Nowowiejski, and Artur Rubinstein, singer Jan Kiepura.

Theatre was immensely popular in the interbellum, with three main centres in the cities of Warsaw, Wilno and Lwów. Altogether, there were 103 theatres in Poland and a number of other theatrical institutions (including 100 folk theatres). In 1936, different shows were seen by 5 million people, and main figures of Polish theatre of the time were Juliusz Osterwa, Stefan Jaracz, and Leon Schiller. Also, before the outbreak of the war, there were approximately one million radios (see Radio stations in interwar Poland).

Administrative division
The administrative division of the Republic was based on a three-tier system. On the lowest rung were the gminy, local town and village governments akin to districts or parishes. These were then grouped together into powiaty (akin to counties), which, in turn, were grouped as województwa (voivodeships, akin to provinces).

Demographics
Historically, Poland was almost always a multiethnic country. This was especially true for the Second Republic, when independence was once again achieved in the wake of the First World War and the subsequent Polish–Soviet War, the latter war being officially ended by the Peace of Riga. The census of 1921 shows 30.8% of the population consisted of ethnic minorities, compared with a share of 1.6% (solely identifying with a non-Polish ethnic group) or 3.8% (including those identifying with both the Polish ethnicity and with another ethnic group) in 2011. The first spontaneous flight of about 500,000 Poles from the Soviet Union occurred during the reconstitution of sovereign Poland. In the second wave, between November 1919 and June 1924, some 1,200,000 people left the territory of the USSR for Poland. It is estimated that some 460,000 of them spoke Polish as the first language. According to the 1931 Polish Census: 68.9% of the population was Polish, 13.9% were Ukrainian, around 10% Jewish, 3.1% Belarusian, 2.3% German and 2.8% other, including Lithuanian, Czech, Armenian, Russian, and Romani. The situation of minorities was a complex subject and changed during the period.

Poland was also a nation of many religions. In 1921, 16,057,229 Poles (approx. 62.5%) were Roman (Latin) Catholics, 3,031,057 citizens of Poland (approx. 11.8%) were Eastern Rite Catholics (mostly Ukrainian Greek Catholics and Armenian Rite Catholics), 2,815,817 (approx. 10.95%) were Orthodox, 2,771,949 (approx. 10.8%) were Jewish, and 940,232 (approx. 3.7%) were Protestants (mostly Lutheran).

By 1931, Poland had the second largest Jewish population in the world, with one-fifth of all the world's Jews residing within its borders (approx. 3,136,000). The urban population of interbellum Poland was rising steadily; in 1921, only 24% of Poles lived in the cities, in the late 1930s, that proportion grew to 30%. In more than a decade, the population of Warsaw grew by 200,000, Łódź by 150,000, and Poznań – by 100,000. This was due not only to internal migration, but also to an extremely high birth rate.

Largest cities in the Second Polish Republic

Prewar population density

Status of ethnic minorities
Jews
From the 1920s, the Polish government excluded Jews from receiving government bank loans, public sector employment, and obtaining business licenses. From the 1930s, measures were taken against Jewish shops, Jewish export firms, Shechita as well as limitations being placed on Jewish admission to the medical and legal professions, Jews in business associations and the enrollment of Jews into universities. The political movement National Democracy (Endecja, from the abbreviation "ND") often organised anti-Jewish business boycotts. Following the death of Marshal Józef Piłsudski in 1935, the Endecja intensified their efforts, which triggered violence in extreme cases in smaller towns across the country. In 1937, the National Democracy movement passed resolutions that "its main aim and duty must be to remove the Jews from all spheres of social, economic, and cultural life in Poland". The government in response organised the Camp of National Unity (OZON), which in 1938 took control of the Polish Sejm and subsequently drafted anti-Semitic legislation similar to the Anti-Jewish laws in Germany, Hungary, and Romania. OZON advocated mass emigration of Jews from Poland, numerus clausus (see also Ghetto benches), and other limitations on Jewish rights. According to William W. Hagen, by 1939, prior to the war, Polish Jews were threatened with conditions similar to those in Nazi Germany.

Ukrainians
The pre-war government also restricted the rights of people who declared Ukrainian nationality, belonged to the Eastern Orthodox Church and inhabited the Eastern Borderlands of the Second Polish Republic. Ukrainian was restricted in every field possible, especially in governmental institutions, and the term "Ruthenian" was enforced in an attempt to ban the use of the term "Ukrainian". Ukrainians were categorised as uneducated second-class peasants or third world people, and rarely settled outside the Eastern Borderland region due to the prevailing Ukrainophobia and restrictions imposed. Numerous attempts at restoring the Ukrainian state were suppressed and any existent violence or terrorism initiated by the Organization of Ukrainian Nationalists was emphasised to create the image of a "brutal Eastern savage".

Geography
The largest lake was Lake Narach.

Extreme geographical points of Poland included Przeświata River in Somino to the north (located in the Braslaw county of the Wilno Voivodeship); Manczin River to the south (located in the Kosów county of the Stanisławów Voivodeship); Spasibiorki near railway to Połock to the east (located in the Dzisna county of the Wilno Voivodeship); and Mukocinek near Warta River and Meszyn Lake to the west (located in the Międzychód county of the Poznań Voivodeship).

Waters
The remaining part of the country was drained southward, into the Black Sea, by the rivers that drain into the Dnieper (Pripyat, Horyn and Styr, all together ) as well as Dniester

German–Soviet–Slovak invasion of Poland in 1939

The beginning of the Second World War in September 1939 ended the sovereign Second Polish Republic. The German invasion of Poland began on 1 September 1939, one week after Nazi Germany and the Soviet Union signed the secret Molotov–Ribbentrop Pact. On that day, Germany and Slovakia attacked Poland, and on 17 September the Soviets attacked eastern Poland. Warsaw fell to the Nazis on 28 September after a twenty-day siege. Open organised Polish resistance ended on 6 October 1939 after the Battle of Kock, with Germany and the Soviet Union occupying most of the country. Lithuania annexed the area of Wilno, and Slovakia seized areas along Poland's southern border - including Górna Orawa and Tatranská Javorina - which Poland had annexed from Czechoslovakia in October 1938. Poland did not surrender to the invaders, but continued fighting under the auspices of the Polish government-in-exile and of the Polish Underground State. After the signing of the German–Soviet Treaty of Friendship, Cooperation and Demarcation on 28 September 1939, Polish areas occupied by Nazi Germany either became directly incorporated into Nazi Germany, or became part of the General Government. The Soviet Union, following Elections to the People's Assemblies of Western Ukraine and Western Belarus (22 October 1939), annexed eastern Poland partly to the Byelorussian Soviet Socialist Republic, and partly to the Ukrainian Soviet Socialist Republic (November 1939).

Polish war plans (Plan West and Plan East) failed as soon as Germany invaded in 1939. The Polish losses in combat against Germans (killed and missing in action) amounted to ca. 70,000 men. Some 420,000 of them were taken prisoners. Losses against the Red Army (which invaded Poland on 17 September) added up to 6,000 to 7,000 of casualties and MIA, 250,000 were taken prisoners. Although the Polish Army – considering the inactivity of the Allies – was in an unfavourable position – it managed to inflict serious losses to the enemies: 20,000 German soldiers were killed or MIA, 674 tanks and 319 armored vehicles destroyed or badly damaged, 230 aircraft shot down; the Red Army lost (killed and MIA) about 2,500 soldiers, 150 combat vehicles and 20 aircraft. The Soviet invasion of Poland, and lack of promised aid from the Western Allies, contributed to the Polish forces defeat by 6 October 1939.

A popular myth is that Polish cavalry armed with lances charged German tanks during the September 1939 campaign. This often repeated account, first reported by Italian journalists as German propaganda, concerned an action by the Polish 18th Lancer Regiment near Chojnice. This arose from misreporting of a single clash on 1 September 1939 near Krojanty, when two squadrons of the Polish 18th Lancers armed with sabers surprised and wiped out a German infantry formation with a mounted saber charge. Shortly after midnight the 2nd (Motorized) Division was compelled to withdraw by Polish cavalry, before the Poles were caught in the open by German armored cars. The story arose because some German armored cars appeared and gunned down 20 troopers as the cavalry escaped. Even this failed to persuade everyone to reexamine their beliefs—there were some who thought Polish cavalry had been improperly employed in 1939.

Between 1939 and 1990, the Polish government-in-exile operated in Paris and later in London, presenting itself as the only legal and legitimate representative of the Polish nation. In 1990, the last president in exile, Ryszard Kaczorowski, handed the presidential insignia to the newly elected President, Lech Wałęsa, signifying continuity between the Second and Third republics.

See also

History of Poland (1918–39)
1938 in Poland
1939 in Poland
Polish–Lithuanian Commonwealth, also known as the "First Polish Republic" and described as a "republic under the presidency of the King"

Notes

References

Further reading
Davies, Norman. God's Playground. A History of Poland. Vol. 2: 1795 to the Present. Oxford: Oxford University Press, 1981. pp 393–434
Latawaski, Paul. Reconstruction of Poland 1914–23 (1992) 
Leslie, R. F. et al. The History of Poland since 1863. Cambridge U. Press, 1980. 494 pp.
Lukowski, Jerzy and Zawadzki, Hubert. A Concise History of Poland. Cambridge U. Press, 2nd ed 2006. 408pp. excerpts and search
Pogonowski, Iwo Cyprian. Poland: A Historical Atlas. Hippocrene, 1987. 321 pp. new designed maps
Stachura, Peter D. Poland, 1918–1945: An Interpretive and Documentary History of the Second Republic (2004) online
Stachura, Peter D. ed. Poland Between the Wars, 1918–1939 (1998) essays by scholars
Watt, Richard M. Bitter Glory: Poland and Its Fate, 1918–1939 (1998) excerpt and text search, comprehensive survey

Politics and diplomacy
Cienciala, Anna M. "The Foreign Policy of Józef Pi£sudski and Józef Beck, 1926–1939: Misconceptions and Interpretations," The Polish Review (2011) 56#1 pp. 111–151 in JSTOR; earlier version
Cienciala, Anna M. (1968), Poland the Western Powers, 1938–1939. A Study in the Interdependence of Eastern and Western Europe. PDF, Kansas U. Press.
Cienciala, Anna M., and Titus Komarnicki (1984), From Versailles to Locarno, Keys to Polish Foreign Policy, 1919–1925 PDF, Kansas U. Press. 
Drzewieniecki, Walter M. "The Polish Army on the Eve of World War II," Polish Review (1981) 26#3 pp 54–64.
Garlicki, Andrzej. Józef Piłsudski, 1867–1935 (New York: Scolar Press 1995), scholarly biography; one-vol version of 4 vol Polish edition
Hetherington, Peter. Unvanquished: Joseph Pilsudski, Resurrected Poland, and the Struggle for Eastern Europe (2012) 752pp excerpt and text search
Jędrzejewicz, W. Piłsudski. A Life for Poland (1982), scholarly biography
Kantorosinski, Zbigniew. Emblem of Good Will: a Polish Declaration of Admiration and Friendship for the United States of America. Washington, DC: Library of Congress (1997)
Polonsky, A. Politics in Independent Poland, 1921–1939: The Crisis of Constitutional Government (1972)
Riekhoff, H. von.  German-Polish Relations, 1918–1933 (Johns Hopkins University Press 1971)
Rothschild, J. Piłsudski's Coup d'État (New York: Columbia University Press 1966)
Wandycz, P. S. Polish Diplomacy 1914–1945: Aims and Achievements (1988)
Wandycz, P. S. Soviet-Polish Relations, 1917–1921 (Harvard University Press 1969)
Wandycz, P. S. The United States and Poland (1980)
Zamoyski, Adam. Warsaw 1920: Lenin's Failed Conquest of Europe (2008) excerpt and text search

Social and economic topics
Abramsky, C. et al. eds. The Jews in Poland (Oxford: Blackwell 1986)
Blanke, R. Orphans of Versailles. The Germans in Western Poland, 1918–1939 (1993)
Gutman, Y. et al. eds. The Jews of Poland Between Two World Wars (1989).
Landau, Z. and Tomaszewski, J. The Polish Economy in the Twentieth Century (Routledge, 1985)
Moklak, Jaroslaw. The Lemko Region in the Second Polish Republic: Political and Interdenominational Issues 1918–1939 (2013); covers Old Rusyns, Moscophiles and National Movement Activists, & the political role of the Greek Catholic and Orthodox Churches 
Olszewski, A. K. An Outline of Polish Art and Architecture, 1890–1980 (Warsaw: Interpress 1989.)
Roszkowski, W. Landowners in Poland, 1918–1939 (Cambridge University Press, 1991)
Staniewicz, Witold. "The Agrarian Problem in Poland between the Two World Wars," Slavonic and East European Review (1964) 43#100 pp. 23–33 in JSTOR
Taylor, J. J. The Economic Development of Poland, 1919–1950 (Cornell University Press 1952)
Wynot, E. D. Warsaw Between the Wars. Profile of the Capital City in a Developing Land, 1918–1939 (1983)
Żółtowski, A. Border of Europe. A Study of the Polish Eastern Provinces (London: Hollis & Carter 1950)
Eva Plach, "Dogs and dog breeding in interwar Poland," Canadian Slavonic Papers 60. no 3-4

Primary sources
Small Statistical Yearbook, 1932 (Mały rocznik statystyczny 1932) complete text (in Polish)
Small Statistical Yearbook, 1939 (Mały rocznik statystyczny 1939)  complete text (in Polish)

Historiography
Kenney, Padraic. "After the Blank Spots Are Filled: Recent Perspectives on Modern Poland", Journal of Modern History (2007) 79#1 pp 134–61, in JSTOR
Polonsky, Antony. "The History of Inter-War Poland Today," Survey'' (1970) pp143–159.

External links
Bbs.keyhole.com: Google Earth map with borders of the Second Republic of Poland
Polish Tangos: The Unique Inter-War Soundtrack to Poland's Independence
Polish Cinema's Golden Age: The Glamour & Progress Of Poland's Inter-War Films
‘Pakty i Fakty’: The Last-Ever Polish Interwar Cabaret Revue
Map of Poland (March 1920) from the Leventhal Map & Education Center at the Boston Public Library

 
Modern history of Poland
Former countries in Europe
Poland, Second Republic
1918 in Poland
1919 in Poland
1920s in Poland
1930s in Poland
Józef Piłsudski
Political history of Poland
States and territories established in 1918
States and territories disestablished in 1939
1918 establishments in Poland
1939 disestablishments in Poland
20th century in Poland
History of Ukraine (1918–1991)
Polish Republic, Second
Polish Republic, Second
Polish Republic, Second
Former countries